Trevor Simpson (born 1951), is a male former diver who competed for Great Britain and England.

Diving career
Simpson represented Great Britain at the 1976 Summer Olympics.

He also represented England and won a bronze medal in the 3 metres springboard, at the 1974 British Commonwealth Games in Christchurch, New Zealand. Four years later he competed again for England in the springboard event, at the 1978 Commonwealth Games in Edmonton, Alberta, Canada.

He competed for the Highgate Diving Club.

References

1951 births
English male divers
Divers at the 1974 British Commonwealth Games
Divers at the 1978 Commonwealth Games
Living people
Commonwealth Games medallists in diving
Commonwealth Games bronze medallists for England
Olympic divers of Great Britain
Divers at the 1976 Summer Olympics
Medallists at the 1974 British Commonwealth Games